Hubert "Hugh" Thompson (29 April 1914 – 23 February 1943) was a Canadian middle-distance runner. He competed in the men's 1500 metres at the 1936 Summer Olympics. He was killed in action during World War II.

References

External links
 

1914 births
1943 deaths
Athletes (track and field) at the 1936 Summer Olympics
Canadian male middle-distance runners
Olympic track and field athletes of Canada
Place of birth missing
Royal Air Force personnel killed in World War II